The NW type S is a series of large automobiles manufactured by Nesselsdorfer Wagenbau-Fabriks-Gesellschaft A.G. (NW, now known as Tatra), in Moravia, in what was then Austria-Hungary. 

Hans Ledwinka, who left the company in 1902, was hired back in 1905 (meanwhile he worked for company of Alexander Friedman in Vienna). Immediately he started working on a new car with modern and progressive design. Some of the new features included overhead valves, actuated by overhead camshaft (OHC), and hemispherical combustion chamber. The water-cooled engine was mounted at three points and the engine block had large service access doors. The engine with the gearbox formed one massive unit, so-called monoblock.

The gearbox itself was of a bell shape with only five gears. Two gears were ring type with teeth on the inside surface. Individual speeds were engaged by moving the gears radially. The rear axle was driven by a drive shaft in lieu of chains.

The S 4 and S 6 with four-cylinder or six-cylinder engines were able to reach maximum speeds of 80 km/h and 100 km/h (50/62 mph). The S 18/24 and 16/20 models developed , while the S4 20/30 offered . The later, six-cylinder S 6 40/50 version was an S4 with two cylinders added; it produced  and was introduced in 1910. The total production of both models was 74 units.

References

Cars of the Czech Republic
Tatra vehicles
Rear-wheel-drive vehicles
1910s cars
Vehicles introduced in 1906